Raymond King may refer to:

 Raymond B. King (born 1965), American executive
 Jin Yan (1910–1983) or Raymond King, Korean-born Chinese actor
 Ray King (entrepreneur) (born 1964), American entrepreneur
 Ray King (footballer) (1924–2014), English footballer
 Raymond Idoreyin King, Nigerian footballer goalkeeper who played in the 1984 African Cup of Champions Clubs Final
 Raymond King (navy officer), Commander of the Defence Force (Bahamas) since 2020

See also
Ray King (disambiguation)